Crocus flavus, known as yellow crocus, Dutch yellow crocus or snow crocus, is a species of flowering plant in the genus Crocus of the family Iridaceae. It grows wild on the slopes of Greece, former Yugoslavia, Bulgaria, Romania and northwestern Turkey, with fragrant bright orange-yellow flowers.  It is a small crocus (despite the names of some cultivars, compared to the giant Dutch crocuses (C. vernus). Its cultivars are used as ornamental plants.

The Latin specific epithet flavus means "yellow".

Description
Crocus flavus is a herbaceous perennial geophyte growing from a corm. The globe shaped corms are relatively large for a crocus species, and the tunics have parallel fibers. The chromosome count is 2N=8 with 11 B-chromosomes. 

Subspecies
 Crocus flavus subsp. dissectus T.Baytop & B.Mathew - western Turkey
 Crocus flavus subsp. flavus - Greece, Turkey, Balkans; naturalized in Utah
 Crocus flavus subsp. sarichinarensis Rukšans - Turkey

Crocus flavus subsp. flavus has gained the Royal Horticultural Society's Award of Garden Merit.

Cultivation
Crocus flavus naturalizes well in gardens, and has escaped cultivation and become naturalized in the US state of Arkansas. The majority of plants grown in gardens are triploids that do not produce seeds and are propagated vegetatively. The species has been hybridized with other crocus species to produce a number of other cultivars.

Cultivars include Crocus flavus 'Grosser Gelber' ('Big Yellow'), with large orange-yellow flowers.

References

External links

 Özdemir, Canan. The Morphology and Anatomy of Crocus flavus Weston subsp. flavus (Iridaceae), Turk J Bot 30 (2006) 175-180
 ITIS
 Alpine Garden Society
 International Flower Bulb Centre
 Uniprot Taxonomy

flavus
Garden plants
Flora of Southeastern Europe
Plants described in 1771
Taxa named by Richard Weston (botanist)